Jordan "Ratbeard" Hastings (born March 15, 1982) is a Canadian musician born in Hamilton, Ontario. He is best known as the drummer of Alexisonfire, having replaced their former drummer Jesse Ingelevics. Hastings was originally intended to be a temporary replacement, but then became a full member after two months, with his first album with the band being Crisis in 2006.

Hastings was previously the drummer for the Burlington-based bands Jersey, Chapter One, and Hoodrat, none of which are currently active. He is currently active as a member of Cunter.

In 2011, Hastings co-created, with Joel Carriere, the Dine Alone Records side project Dine Alone Foods. In mid-2012 he co-founded a cigar, tobacco and barber shop Burlington, Ontario, Village Cigar Company And Barbershop. He sold his share in 2013.

Hastings is now drummer for the trio Say Yes, which consists of guitarist/vocalist Adam Michael and bassist/vocalist Michael Zane and will release their debut self-titled EP August 19, 2014 with Dine Alone Records.

In January 2016, Hastings began filling in for Aaron Solowoniuk in the band Billy Talent, after Solowoniuk had a multiple sclerosis relapse. He recorded the drums for their album Afraid of Heights, released in July 2016. With Solowoniuk still unable to play after the album's release, Hastings then went on further with the band, playing the subsequent tour promoting the album and on the band's latest album, Crisis of Faith.

References

1982 births
Living people
Canadian punk rock drummers
Canadian male drummers
Musicians from Hamilton, Ontario
Alexisonfire members
21st-century Canadian drummers
21st-century Canadian male musicians